Automatic is the 2015 ninth studio album of the American house DJ and electronic music producer Kaskade. It was released on September 25, 2015 through Warner Bros. Records & Arkade. Album is available worldwide on iTunes.

Track listing

Charts

Weekly charts

Year-end charts

Release history

References

External links
 
 
 

2015 albums
Kaskade albums